The Nelmar Terrace Historic District is a U.S. historic district in St. Augustine, Florida. The district is roughly bounded by Hospital Creek on the east, San Marco Ave. on the west, San Carlos Ave. 
on the south and Milton and Alfred streets on the north.

It was added to the National Register of Historic Places on March 28, 2011.

References

National Register of Historic Places in St. Johns County, Florida
Historic districts on the National Register of Historic Places in Florida
St. Augustine, Florida